We Who Are About To... is a feminist science fiction novel by Joanna Russ. It first appeared in magazine form in the January 1976 and February 1976 issues of Galaxy Science Fiction and was first published in book form by Dell Publishing in July 1977.

The book's plot focuses on an unnamed protagonist, who is the only female member of a group of people stranded on a hostile planet. When the male group members attempt to rape the protagonist, she kills them in self defense, leaving her to confront loneliness and starvation. While the book was poorly received by critics when it was first published, later reappraisals were more favorable.

Plot
The story takes the form of an audio diary kept by the unnamed protagonist. A group of people, with no technical skills and scant supplies, are stranded on a planet and debate how to survive. The men in the group are dedicated to colonizing and populating the planet, but the unnamed female protagonist, who does not believe that long-term survival is possible, resists being made pregnant by them. Tensions escalate into violence, until finally she is forced to kill the other survivors in order to defend herself against rape. Left alone, she becomes increasingly philosophical, recounting her personal history in political agitation and attempting to chart the days and seasons even as she begins to hallucinate from hunger and loneliness. She experiences visions, first of the people she killed, and then of people from her past. Finally, weak from hunger, she resolves to kill herself.

Reception
We Who Are About To... received poor reviews at the time of publication, and was panned by Spider Robinson writing in Analog, and by Algis Budrys in The Magazine of Fantasy and Science Fiction. Later reviews have been more positive, however; David Pringle referred to it as "a grim tale which inverts the usual sf myth of human indomitability" in The Ultimate Guide to Science Fiction, and Sarah LeFanu said in In the Chinks of the World Machine: Feminism and Science Fiction that "for all its brevity [it] can withstand a multiplicity of readings. It is about how to die, then it is as much about how to live." Samuel R. Delany called We Who Are About To... "a damningly fine analysis of the mechanics of political and social decay", offering the interpretation that "Russ suggests that the quality of life is the purpose of living, and reproduction only a reparative process to extend that quality—and not the point of life at all... only feudal societies can really believe wholly that reproduction... is life's real point."

Publication history
 January 1976, United States, Galaxy Science Fiction, Jan 1976, ed. James Baen, publ. UPD Publishing Corporation, magazine
 February 1976, United States, Galaxy Science Fiction, Feb 1976, ed. James Baen, publ. UPD Publishing Corporation, magazine
 July 1977, United States, published by Dell Publishing, paperback
 May 1978, United States, published by Dell Publishing, paperback
 November 1978, Great Britain, published by Magnum Books, paperback
 December 1978, United States, published by Gregg Press, hardcover 
 August 1987, Great Britain, published by The Women's Press, paperback
 March 2005, United States, published by Wesleyan University Press, trade paperback
 February 2017, Great Britain, published by Penguin Books, paperback

References

External links
 
 

Feminist science fiction novels
American science fiction novels
1977 science fiction novels
1977 American novels
Works by Joanna Russ
Works originally published in Galaxy Science Fiction
Dell Publishing books